Vanier is a former city in central Quebec, Canada. It was amalgamated into Quebec City in 2002. It is located within the Borough of Les Rivières. Population (2001): 11,504

Fleur de Lys centre commercial, a shopping centre is located in Vanier. It is contains a mix of residential and industrial areas and is considered a working class district of the city. The southern portion of the district follows a grid pattern layout and contains many 2 story duplex properties and a high school, whilst the northern part is more suburban in nature and contains more single story homes.

Neighbourhoods in Quebec City
Former municipalities in Quebec
Populated places disestablished in 2002
2002 disestablishments in Quebec